The 1st millennium BC, also known as the last millennium BC, was the period of time lasting from the years 1000 BC to 1 BC (10th to 1st centuries BC; in astronomy: JD   –  ). It encompasses the Iron Age in the Old World and sees the transition from the Ancient Near East to classical antiquity.

World population  roughly doubled over the course of the millennium, from about 100 million to about 200–250 million.

Overview

The Neo-Assyrian Empire dominates the Near East in the early centuries of the millennium, supplanted by the Achaemenid Empire in the 6th century. Ancient Egypt is in decline, and falls to the Achaemenids in 525 BC.

In Greece, Classical Antiquity begins with the colonization of Magna Graecia and peaks with the conquest of the Achaemenids  and the subsequent flourishing of Hellenistic civilization (4th to 2nd centuries).

The Roman Republic supplants the Etruscans and then the Carthaginians (5th to 3rd centuries). The close of the millennium sees the rise of the Roman Empire. The early Celts dominate Central Europe while Northern Europe is in the Pre-Roman Iron Age. In East Africa, the Nubian Empire and Aksum arise.

In South Asia, the Vedic civilization gives rise to the Maurya Empire.  The Scythians dominate Central Asia. In China, the Zhou dynasty rules the Chinese heartland at the beginning of the millennium. The decline of the Zhou dynasty during Spring and Autumn period and the Warring States period sees the rise of such philosophical and spiritual traditions as Confucianism and Taoism. Towards the close of the millennium, the Han Dynasty extends Chinese power towards Central Asia, where it borders on Indo-Greek and Iranian states.  Japan is in the Yayoi period. 

The Olmec civilization declines, and the Maya and Zapotec civilizations emerge in Mesoamerica. The Chavín culture flourishes in Peru.

The first millennium BC is the formative period of the classical world religions, with the development of early Judaism and Zoroastrianism in the Near East, and Vedic religion and Vedanta, Jainism and Buddhism in India. Early literature develops in Greek, Latin, Hebrew, Sanskrit, Tamil  and Chinese. The term Axial Age, coined by Karl Jaspers, is intended to express the crucial importance of the period of c. the 8th to 2nd centuries BC in world history.

World population more than doubled over the course of the millennium, 
from about an estimated 50–100 million to an estimated 170–300 million.
Close to 90% of world population at the end of the first millennium BC lived in the Iron Age civilizations of the Old World (Roman Empire, Parthian Empire, Graeco-Indo-Scythian and Hindu kingdoms, Han China). 
The population of the Americas was below 20 million, concentrated in Mesoamerica (Epi-Olmec culture);
that of Sub-Saharan Africa was likely below 10 million. The population of Oceania was likely less than one million people.

Ancient history

Timeline

10th century BC
Near East: Neo-Assyrian Empire
Near East: Shoshenq I invades Canaan
Aegean: Helladic period ends
9th century BC 
Chavín culture in Peru
Egypt: 872 BC: Nile floods the Temple of Luxor
Egypt: 836 BC: Civil war in Egypt
 North Africa: 814 BC: Carthage founded 
China: 841 BC–828 BC Gonghe Regency
8th century BC 
727 BC: Egypt: Kushite invasion (25th dynasty)
771 BC: China: Spring and Autumn period
Near East: 727 BC: Death of Tiglath-Pileser III, Babylonia secedes from Assyria
Near East: 722 BC: Sargon II takes Samaria; Assyrian captivity of the Israelites.
Greece: Archaic Greece, Greek alphabet
Greece: Homer
776 BC:  Greece:  First Olympiad
753 BC: Europe: foundation of Rome
7th century BC
671 BC: Assyrian conquest of Egypt
Near East: 631 BC: Death of Ashurbanipal, decline of the Assyrian Empire
6th century BC 
Egypt: 592 BC: Psamtik II sacks Napata
Sudan: Aspelta moves the Kushite capital to Meroe 
Near East: 539 BC: Achaemenid conquest of Babylon under Cyrus the Great
South Asia: Śramaṇa movement and "second urbanisation"
South Asia: Early Buddhism
Europe: 509 BC: Roman Republic
5th century BC 
China: 479 BC: death of Confucius 
China: 476 BC: Warring States period
China: 486 BC: Grand Canal construction begins
Near East: Second Temple Judaism, redaction of the Hebrew Bible
 Greece: beginning of the classical period (Greece in the 5th century BC).
 Greece: Greco-Persian Wars (Battle of Marathon, Battle of Thermopylae)
 Greece: 440 BC: Herodotus' Histories
 Greece: 431 BC: Peloponnesian War
Oceania: Austronesian expansion reaches Western Polynesia
4th century BC 
Greece: 395 BC: Corinthian War
Egypt: 343 BC: Achaemenid conquest
Greece/Asia/Egypt: 330s BC: conquests of Alexander the Great, end of the Achaemenid Empire, Macedonian Empire, beginning of the Hellenistic period
South Asia: Mauryan Empire
3rd century BC 
China: Qin Unified China
China: 206 BC: Han Dynasty
South Asia: 261 BC: Kalinga war
Rome: Roman expansion in Italy
Rome/Carthage: Punic Wars
 264 BC: First Punic War
 218 BC Second Punic War
2nd century BC 
Rome/Carthage: 149 BC Third Punic War, Roman province of Africa
Rome/Greece: 146 BC Battle of Corinth, beginning of the Roman era
South Asia: 185 BC:  Fall of the Maurya Empire
China:   Confucianism became the state ideology of China
1st century BC  
China: 91 BC: Records of the Grand Historian finished
Rome/Europe: 58–50 BC Gallic Wars 
Rome: 32/30 BC: Final War of the Roman Republic (Battle of Actium)
Rome/Egypt: 31 BC: Roman conquest of Egypt
Rome/Europe/West Asia/Africa: 27 BC: Roman Empire

Inventions, discoveries, introductions

 
8th century BC
 Greek alphabet, the first alphabet with vowels.
7th century BC
Trireme
6th century BC
paved trackway
 Pythagorean theorem
Monotheism
5th century BC
 Blast furnace China
 Atomism
crossbow
siege engine
4th century BC
formal grammar
Kyrenia ship
3rd century BC
Lighthouse of Alexandria
Malleable Cast iron China
 buoyancy (Archimedes)
 Spherical earth
 water clock
 Qin built and unified various sections of the Great Wall of China.
 Qin built Qin Shi Huang's Mausoleum guarded by the life-sized Terracotta Army.
2nd century BC
Antikythera mechanism

Literature

Greco-Roman literature

Archaic period
Homer (late 8th or early 7th c.), Iliad, Odyssey
Hesiod (8th to 7th c.), Theogony and Works and Days
Archilochus (7th century), Greek poet
Sappho, (late 7th to early 6th c.), Greek poet
 Ibycus
 Alcaeus of Mytilene
 Aesop's Fables
Classical period
Aeschylus (c. 525–455 BC), Greek playwright
Herodotus (484–425 BC), Histories
Euripides (c. 480–406 BC), Greek playwright
 Xenophon: Anabasis, Cyropaedia
Aristotle (384–322 BC), corpus Aristotelicum
Hellenistic to Roman period
 Septuagint
 Apollonius of Rhodes: Argonautica
 Callimachus (310/305-240 B.C.), lyric poet
 Manetho: Aegyptiaca
 Theocritus, lyric poet
 Euclid: Elements
 Menander: Dyskolos
 Theophrastus: Enquiry into Plants
 Old Latin Livius Andronicus, Gnaeus Naevius, Plautus, Quintus Fabius Pictor, Lucius Cincius Alimentus 
 Classical Latin: Cicero, Julius Caesar, Virgil, Lucretius, Livy, Catullus

Chinese literature

I Ching (date unknown, between the 10th and 4th centuries BC)
 Classic of Poetry (Shījīng), Classic of Documents (Shūjīng) (authentic portions), Classic of Changes (I Ching)
 Spring and Autumn Annals (Chūnqiū) (722–481 BC, chronicles of the state of Lu)
 Confucius: Analects (Lúnyǔ)
 Classic of Rites (Lǐjì)
 Commentaries of Zuo (Zuǒzhuàn)
 Laozi (or Lao Tzu): Tao Te Ching
 Zhuangzi: Zhuangzi (book)
 Mencius: Mencius

Sanskrit literature

Vedic Sanskrit: Vedas, Brahmanas
Vedanga
Mukhya Upanishads
early layers of the Sanskrit epics (c. 3rd century BC to 4th century AD)

Hebrew 

 c. 8th to 7th c.:  the Book of Nahum, Book of Hosea, Book of Amos, Book of Isaiah
 c. 6th c.: Psalms
 c. 5th century: redaction of the Torah
 3rd century: Ecclesiastes
 2nd century: Book of Wisdom

Avestan
 Yasht, Avesta, Vendidad

Other  (2nd to 1st century BC)

Pali literature: Tipitaka
Tamil :Sangam literature
Aramaic: Book of Daniel

Archaeology

Astronomy

Historical solar eclipses

Centuries and decades

References

 

 
-99